In Greek mythology, Pantariste was an Amazon who fought on Hippolyte's side against Heracles and his troops.

A black-figure vase painting of the 6th century BCE depicts Pantariste defeating the Greek warrior Timiades. The same painting features two other similar "Greek hero vs. Amazon" fighting scenes: Heracles about to kill Andromache; and Telamon attacking Ainippe.

See also
Antiope (Amazon)
Orithyia (Amazon)
Areto
Iphito

Note

References 
Blok, Josine H. The early Amazons: modern and ancient perspectives on a persistent myth. BRILL, 1995; page 218; List of Illustrations, page xxi
Wilhelm Heinrich Roscher (ed.): Ausführliches Lexikon der griechischen und römischen Mythologie. Band 3 (N - P). Leipzig, 1897 - 1902, s. 1550

Amazons (Greek mythology)